Resort Municipality, officially named the Resort Municipality of Stanley Bridge, Hope River, Bayview, Cavendish and North Rustico, is the lone municipality in Prince Edward Island, Canada that holds resort municipality status. It was established in 1990.

History 
A rural resort area to the north and northwest of North Rustico, comprising several communities, was incorporated as the Resort Municipality of Stanley Bridge, Hope River, Bayview, Cavendish and North Rustico by order in council in 1990.

Geography 

It borders the Town of North Rustico and straddles several geographic levels in the province, including the townships of Lot 21, Lot 22, Lot 23 and Lot 24 as well as the parishes of Grenville and Charlotte.

Localities within Resort Municipality include Bayview, Cavendish, Stanley Bridge, and Green Gables. The municipal office is located in Cavendish at the intersection of Route 6 and Route 13.

Demographics 

Government 
Resort Municipality is governed by an elected council comprising a chair and six councillors. The chair of the current council is Matthew Jelley while the remaining council seats are held by councillors David Gauthier, Kay Hryckiw, Linda Lowther, Edmond Richard, George Clark Dunning and Gwen Wyand. The municipality's chief administrative officer is Brenda MacDonald. Administrative Assistant - Darlene Howell.

References

External links 

Communities in Queens County, Prince Edward Island
Resort municipalities in Prince Edward Island